Agra West (Vidhan Sabha constituency) was a legislative assembly of Uttar Pradesh. As a consequence of the orders of the Delimitation Commission, Agra West (Vidhan Sabha constituency) it ceased to exist in 2012.

Member of Legislative Assembly
The Members of Legislative Assembly are given follows-

References

External links
https://web.archive.org/web/20070824032233/http://eci.gov.in/electionanalysis/AE/S24/partycomp343.htm

Agra
Former assembly constituencies of Uttar Pradesh
Politics of Agra district